Mohawk is an unincorporated community in Buck Creek Township, Hancock County, Indiana.

History
Mohawk was laid out and platted in 1883. It was named after the Mohawk people.

A post office was established at Mohawk in 1882, and remained in operation until it was discontinued in 1955.

Geography

References

Unincorporated communities in Hancock County, Indiana
Unincorporated communities in Indiana
Indianapolis metropolitan area